Fernão Velho (born 14th-century) was a Portuguese nobleman, who served during the Kingdom of Portugal as Alcaide of Veleda. and squire of Peter, Duke of Coimbra.

Biography 

Fernão was born in Portugal, the son of Gonçalo Anes Velho, o Contador, and Margarida Annes Durró, belonging to a noble Portuguese family. His wife was Maria Álvares Cabral, daughter or granddaughter of Álvaro Gil Cabral, Lord of Belmonte, and Catarina Anes de Loureiro, a noble lady, belonging to the Casa do Loureiro. 

Fernão Velho and Maria Álvares Cabral were the parents of Gonçalo Velho Cabral, the discoverer of the Santa Maria and São Miguel Islands.

References

External links 
Nobiliário de familias de Portugal (VELHOS)

14th-century Portuguese people
15th-century Portuguese people
Medieval Portuguese nobility
Place of birth missing